In 1964, Citroën released a range of trucks from 3.5 to 8 ton capacity, styled by Flaminio Bertoni, the Italian sculptor also responsible for the Citroën 2CV, DS, Ami 6, and Traction Avant cars. In production until 1974, the medium-duty truck was intended as the replacement for the older Citroën U23 trucks. The U23, however, was kept in production alongside its replacement until 1969, as they were still profitable in spite of their age.

Although they were named 350 to 850 (N or P models), the trucks' unusual appearance meant they were known as the "Belphégor", after the then-popular television series about a mystery in the Louvre Museum, Belphégor. The number signified the load capacity in tens of kilogrammes. There were diesel and petrol four-cylinder engines (350–480), as well as diesel and petrol six-cylinder ones (600–850) in the heavier-duty models.

External links
Belphégor page
CITROËN WORLD: Truck links

Belphegor (truck)